"Supermodel (You Better Work)" is a song by American dance music singer and drag queen RuPaul. It was released in November 1993 as the third single (but first major label single) from his debut album, Supermodel of the World (1993). The song was a dance club anthem that, though particularly popular within the gay handbag house scene, found mainstream success. The song consists of RuPaul giving advice to a young black supermodel, and briefly several other models, largely consisting of "sashay, shantay!", "work, turn to the left", "work, now turn to the right", and "you better work". The music video for the song, featuring RuPaul in various outfits cavorting around town, became a staple on MTV. Singer Kurt Cobain of Nirvana cited the song as one of his favorites of 1993, and the two were photographed together at the MTV Video Music Awards that year.

"Supermodel" was a modest hit on the pop charts in both the US (number 45) and the UK (number 39). It also reached number two on the US dance chart. This song is RuPaul's highest charting pop hit in the US to date. The song features spoken word snippets by actress LaWanda Page, who went on to appear in several music videos by RuPaul. The single is most commonly found on compact disc coupled with "House of Love", which would go on to become a single itself in some markets. Various 12-inch vinyl releases were also pressed, including a limited edition picture disc in the United Kingdom. It was also covered by Taylor Dayne for The Lizzie McGuire Movie soundtrack.

BuzzFeed ranked "Supermodel (You Better Work)" number 42 in their list of "The 101 Greatest Dance Songs Of the '90s" in 2017. Pitchfork featured it in their lists of "50 Songs That Define the Last 50 Years of LGBTQ+ Pride" in 2018 and "The 250 Best Songs of the 1990s" in 2022.

Chart performance
In the United States, the song peaked on the Billboard Hot 100 at number 45 and the Billboard Hot Dance Club Play chart at number two. It sold nearly 500,000 copies there. It was not only a hit in the US, it also reached number four on the Canadian RPM Dance/Urban chart. In Europe, "Supermodel (You Better Work)" was a top 20 hit in Austria, peaking at number 16. And it entered the top 40 in both the Netherlands (38) and the UK (39), while peaking at number 15 on the UK Dance Singles Chart. In Germany, the song charted at number 100.

Critical reception
Alex Henderson from AllMusic noted, "When he tears into "Supermodel (You Better Work)" and other overtly '70s-influenced dance-floor gems, RuPaul shows himself to be a sweaty, emotional belter who projects a lot more soul and honest emotion than most of the cookie-cutter artists dominating '90s urban-contemporary radio." Larry Flick from Billboard wrote, "New York City club and drag personality returns to the recording world with a festive twirler that aims to lengthen the life of the voguing phenomenon. RuPaul sashays like a seasoned diva over frothy synths and NRG-etic house beats." In 2018, Jim Farber from Entertainment Weekly described it as a "pivotal single/lifestyle slogan", adding that it "became an instant club classic, italicized by a plethora of snap-ready tag lines, including "you better work", "I have one thing to say", and "Sashay/Shantay!" each repeated with intensifying attitude." Caroline Sullivan from The Guardian declared it as "a seventies-style disco workout containing every hysterical cliche of that era, from soaring violins to sonorous groans from Ru. 'See your picture everywhere - a million derriere', Ru observes in a roar recalling the late, great Divine. Absolutely fabulous." 

In his weekly UK chart commentary, James Masterton viewed it as "an unremarkable dance/pop tribute to the world of the supermodels sung by the larger than life Rupaul, drag queen extraordinaire." Pan-European magazine Music & Media commented, "Camp as it is, the musical backing is of course in a stylish '70s disco mode. Give "Supermodel (You Better Work)" and "Miss Lady DJ" a try, it's for all sexes." Andy Beevers from Music Week deemed it a "wonderfully OTT tribute to the stars of the catwalk". Sam Wood from Philadelphia Inquirer felt it succeed at "being more than celebrations of surface - the glitz and gloss of haute couture, the perfect coiffure. Fashion is his/her passion, but RuPaul brings an over-the-top sense of commitment to those tracks. Identity, and what constitutes it, are on the line." Rupert Howe from Select remarked its "catwalk cattiness". Mark Frith from Smash Hits gave the song four out of five, adding, "It's a great hi-NRG dance romp which celebrates the world of the supermodel from the most super of all models. Wonderful."

Music video
The accompanying music video for "Supermodel (You Better Work)" was directed by Randy Barbato. The music video premiered in 1993 on MTV and was an unexpected success, as grunge (such as Nirvana) and gangsta rap were popular at the time. It tells the story of a little black girl (played by RuPaul) in the Brewster projects of Detroit, Michigan, who is spotted by an "Ebony Fashion Fair" talent scout who grows up to become a successful model and is given the title Supermodel of the World. The song features LaWanda Page who has several lines in the song, but does not appear in the music video despite appearances in other RuPaul music videos. The music video is a tribute to RuPaul's early childhood and his career in both the gay community and mainstream culture. The phrase "Supermodel You Better Work" was coined by RuPaul in the 90's. It was nominated for "Best Dance Video" at the 1993 MTV Video Music Awards and won an award in the category for "Best Music Video" on the 1993 WMC International Dance Music Awards.

The music video for "Supermodel (You Better Work)" was later published on Tommy Boy Records' official YouTube channel in September 2018, and had generated more than 5.4 million views as of March 2023.

Impact and legacy
BuzzFeed ranked "Supermodel (You Better Work)" number 42 in their list of "The 101 Greatest Dance Songs Of the '90s" in 2017. Stopera and Galindo stated that this is "the song that brought RuPaul mainstream success."

Pitchfork featured it in their list of "50 Songs That Define the Last 50 Years of LGBTQ+ Pride" in 2018. 

In 2022, Time Out ranked it number 23 in their list of "The 50 Best Gay Songs to Celebrate Pride All Year Long", while Pitchfork placed it at number 222 in their list of "The 250 Best Songs of the 1990s".

The song has been covered several times, notably by Taylor Dayne for The soundtrack of 2003's Hilary Duff's The Lizzie McGuire Movie and as a 2021 single by musician Jimmy Harry under his synthpop outfit Bonsai Mammal with vocals provided by singer Liz.

Track listing
(varies from country to country; this reflects the United States CD single, which sold the most copies)

 "Supermodel (You Better Work)" (Ready to Wear Mix)
 "Supermodel (You Better Work)" (7" Mix)
 "Supermodel (You Better Work)" (Couture Mix)
 "Supermodel (You Better Work)" (La Wanda in Your Face)
 "House of Love" (7" Radio Version)
 "House of Love" (12" Version)
 "House of Love" (Dub)

Charts

Weekly charts

Year-end charts

2006 version

In 2006, RuPaul re-recorded the track with an 80's freestyle inspired backing track and released it as the leadoff single from his album ReWorked. This version reached number 21 on the US dance chart.

Track listing
 US nine track maxi-single
 "Supermodel (You Better Work)" (El Lay Toya Jam) – 3:55
 "Supermodel (You Better Work)" (Craig C. Havenhurst Vocal) – 9:29
 "Supermodel (You Better Work)" (There, U Just Got Rocked Mix) – 4:08
 "My Love Sees No Color" (Electrolight Popular Mix) – 4:02
 "Supermodel (You Better Work)" (Clean El Lay Toya Jam) – 3:55
 "Supermodel (You Better Work)" (Craig C. Encino Edit) – 3:54
 "My Love Sees No Color" (Electrolight Stockholm Mix) – 4:38
 "Supermodel (You Better Work)" (Craig C. Neverland Dub) – 9:25
 "Supermodel (You Better Work)" (Jackopella) – 3:45

 AUS CD No. 1
 "Supermodel (You Better Work)" (El Lay Toya Jam) – 3:55
 "Supermodel (You Better Work)" (Craig C. Neverland Instrumental) – 9:27
 "Coming Out of Hiding" (Trance Gender Mix) – 3:25
 "My Love Sees No Color" (Electrolight Stockholm Mix) – 4:40

 AUS CD No. 2
 "Supermodel (You Better Work)" (Craig C. Encino Edit) – 3:55
 "My Love Sees No Color" (Electrolight Popular Mix) – 4:03
 "My Love Sees No Color" (Matheos' Dancin' Belly Mix) – 4:25
 "My Love Sees No Color" (Electrolight Stockholm Edit) – 4:05*
 "My Love Sees No Color" (Electrolight Popular Extended Club Mix) – 10:21
 "My Love Sees No Color" (Electrolight Stockholm Extended Club Mix) – 11:04
 "Supermodel (You Better Work)" (El Lay Toya Acappella) – 3:56

 (Re)Mix is only a dub/edit

References

1992 debut singles
RuPaul songs
Songs written by Jimmy Harry
LGBT-related songs
Songs written by Larry Tee
1992 songs
Tommy Boy Records singles